Erie is an unincorporated community in Erie Township, Miami County, in the U.S. state of Indiana.

History
The community took its name from Erie Township.

References

Unincorporated communities in Miami County, Indiana
Unincorporated communities in Indiana